Jo + Jazz is a 1960 album recorded by Jo Stafford on Columbia Records. The album was also re-released in 1993 by Corinthian Records.

For this album, Stafford is backed by a line-up of noted jazz musicians including Conte Candoli, Don Fagerquist, Russ Freeman, Johnny Hodges, Mel Lewis, Ray Nance, Jimmy Rowles and Ben Webster, who were under the orchestration of Johnny Mandel.  The album attracted very little attention when it was originally released by Columbia.  It was not recognized as a noteworthy jazz album until Corinthian Records, owned by Stafford and her husband, Paul Weston, re-released it.

Track listing 
"Just Squeeze Me (But Please Don't Tease Me)" (Duke Ellington, Lee Gaines) - 2:57
"For You" (Al Dubin, Joe Burke) - 2:55
"Midnight Sun" (Lionel Hampton, Sonny Burke, Johnny Mercer) - 4:37
"You'd Be So Nice to Come Home To" (Cole Porter) - 3:23
"The Folks Who Live On the Hill" (Jerome Kern, Oscar Hammerstein II) - 3:32
"I Didn't Know About You" (Duke Ellington, Bob Russell) - 3:30
"What Can I Say After I Say I'm Sorry?" (Walter Donaldson, Abe Lyman) - 3:08
"Dream of You" (Jimmie Lunceford, Edward P . Moran, Sy Oliver) - 2:47
"Imagination" (Jimmy Van Heusen, J. Burke) - 3:49
"S'posin" (Andy Razaf, Paul Denniker) - 2:48
"Day Dream" (Ellington, Billy Strayhorn, John La Touche)  - 4:27
"I've Got the World on a String" (Harold Arlen, Ted Koehler) - 3:38

References

1960 albums
Jo Stafford albums
Albums arranged by Johnny Mandel
Albums conducted by Johnny Mandel
Columbia Records albums
Corinthian Records albums
Vocal jazz albums